HMS St Albans is a Type 23 frigate of the Royal Navy. She is the sixth ship to bear the name and is the sixteenth and final ship in the 'Duke' class of frigates. She is based in Devonport, Plymouth.

Operational history

2000–2010
The ship was launched on the River Clyde on Saturday 6 May 2000. She was built at BAE Systems' Yarrows Yard in Scotstoun, Glasgow.

On 27 October 2002, before entering operational service, St Albans was struck by the P&O ferry  when gale-force winds pushed the ferry into the ship whilst secure on her berth in Portsmouth. St Albans suffered damage to the gun deck, the sea boat supports (davits) and the bridge wing. However, no members of the crew were injured. In 2004, Commander Steve Dainton RN took command and the ship was deployed on Operation Oracle duties in the Arabian Sea. In July that year the crew were granted the Freedom of the City by the Mayor of St Albans.

On 13 February 2006, St Albans departed on a six-month deployment to the Gulf region. She arrived in the region in early April, where her tasks included protecting Iraqi oil platforms as well as patrol duties in the northern Gulf. During the trip, she provided a diplomatic role by visiting 16 countries, including Algeria, Albania, Ukraine, Romania, Bulgaria, Turkey and Lebanon. By 12 July 2006 she had completed her tour in the Gulf and had begun her long journey back to Portsmouth via the Suez Canal and the eastern Mediterranean. However, on the same day, the conflict between Israel and Lebanon began. As a result, the Ministry of Defence announced on 17 July that year that St Albans had been redeployed to assist in Operation Highbrow, the evacuation of British citizens trapped in Lebanon. She arrived in the area on 20 July and the following day picked up 243 evacuees from the dock in Beirut and safely transported them to Cyprus. After completing her role in the evacuation, she remained on operational stand-by in the vicinity of Beirut for a short time before being resuming her voyage home. The ship finally arrived back in Portsmouth on 18 August 2006.

Following the ship's successful 6-month tour, St Albans underwent maintenance. During this time, the ship received a new commanding officer, Commander Mark Newland RN. The ship stayed in British waters, participated in submarine training in the Irish Sea, weapon training off the south coast and visited Glasgow on 11 November 2006 to take part in Remembrance Sunday events.

From 5 January until 15 January 2007 the ship was open to the public as part of the London Boat Show. Following this, the ship conducted various training exercises and engineering trials in the UK. The ship's crew then went on Easter leave before returning to conduct more training activities. In May 2007, St Albans entered a period of maintenance that lasted over a year, with her crew temporarily reassigned to other vessels for the duration of the work. The maintenance programme took place in dry dock, situated in Rosyth, with a skeleton crew of engineers supervising the overhaul of several of the ship's systems. Their work included the installation of a new Type 2087 sonar system and converting the ship so that she could operate Merlin helicopters. The upgrade took 15 months and cost £15 million. The ship then returned to her home port of Portsmouth and was accepted back into the fleet in July 2008. The ship was then put through various equipment tests and training routines throughout the later part of the year.

St Albans left Portsmouth on 19 January 2009 to conduct maritime security patrols in the Mediterranean. The ship joined a NATO Task Group in the Mediterranean, protecting busy shipping trade routes. St Albans was also a part of the rapid-response NATO Response Force (NRF). The ship also visited ports in Majorca, Italy and Egypt whilst in the region. She arrived on the Clyde on 7 May 2009 at 1500hrs, heading for Faslane.

St Albans was deployed in the Gulf until mid-2010. She left Portsmouth on 1000hrs on 1 February on a deployment including supporting international efforts in "tackling piracy, illegal trafficking, and smuggling." Later in that deployment St Albans helped the Iraqi government "protect their oil platforms, and provide security to ensure regional stability". After completing her tour in the Middle East, she visited Grand Harbour, Malta for four days in July 2010 on her way back to the United Kingdom.

2011–present
The Worshipful Company of Marketors became affiliated to HMS St Albans in 2011. The warship helped in the recovery of a diver who had got into difficulties near Salcombe on 26 March 2011, although the diver was pronounced dead on arrival at hospital. On 1 July 2011, St Albans rescued 13 sailors off the coast of Oman from the stricken tanker MV Pavit, which had spent three days drifting in a heavy storm after losing power. St Albans used her Merlin helicopter embarked from 829 Naval Air Squadron to winch the crew to safety. The rescued sailors were later transferred to their sister ship, the MV Jag Pushpa. After operating in the Middle East conducting counter-terrorism and anti-piracy operations, having relieved the frigate , She returned to Portsmouth, via Malta and Lisbon, in December 2011.

In March 2012, HMS St Albans visited the Pool of London where she entertained a number of her affiliate organisations and other guests before returning to her home port of Portsmouth to conduct exercises in the Western Approaches. In May, she visited Iceland, where the captain Cdr Tom Sharpe and Britain's Ambassador to Iceland Ian Whitting cast a wreath into Hvalfjörður, once a staging point for the Arctic Convoys to the Soviet Union. After a return to Portsmouth, she sailed up the Elbe to Hamburg to take part in the port's 823rd birthday celebrations. In June, St Albans visited the home of the German Navy in Kiel, joining in the huge maritime event attended by 50 countries, 2000 yachts and pleasure craft and more than 5,000 yachtsmen and women. Before joining in the celebrations, members of the ship's company, two platoons and the ship's guard headed to a remembrance service and wreath laying at the Commonwealth Cemetery at Nordfriedhof.

HMS St Albans continued her home duties visiting the Channel Islands and Holyhead with an extended tour visiting Stavanger, Oslo and Amsterdam. During this deployment she was the last ship to fire the Royal Navy's 4.5" Mk.8 Mod 0 gun off Stavanger. In May 2013 she was handed over to BAe Systems for a refit in Portsmouth Harbour, her home port, silently coached into C lock. She remained in dock until spring 2014 to be modernised for another 10 years. In December 2013, Commander Catherine Jordan RN took command of the ship.

The refit was a mid-life upgrade, modernizing the ship for the following ten years – it cost £25million and was completed on time in spring 2014. It fitted her with the all-electric 'Kryten' 4.5" Mod1 gun and the mid-life upgrade to her Sea Wolf missile system together with a wide range of more detailed improvements. A new crew was then assembled and the ship undertook an extended period of trials developing her military capability and testing her systems integration. During the trials the ship visited Plymouth and Falmouth.

On 3 November 2014 the ship passed her Material Assessment and Safety Check and her Rededication Ceremony was on 1 August 2014, after which she rejoined the fleet. In December 2014 HMS St Albans visited London, mooring alongside  in the Pool of London, and then sailed across the North Sea and down the Nieuwe Maas to visit Rotterdam.

Still based in Portsmouth, she continued trials in the Western English Channel and then visited Trondheim in Norway and continued live firing trials. After completing her extensive Flag Officer Sea Training trails, based at Plymouth, she entered West India Dock, London on 7 July 2015 and then sailed back to Portsmouth. She arrived on 16 July 2015 and became the Guard ship for the Portsmouth America's Cup races later that month. St Albans sailed for a nine-month mission to the Middle East on 27 November 2015, carrying a Merlin HM2 and ScanEagle UAV.

Whilst crossing the Mediterranean she was involved with the seizure of 320 kg of cocaine with a street value of more than £1 million. On 11 January 2016, Defence Secretary Michael Fallon announced that "HMS St Albans will shortly join the Charles de Gaulle aircraft carrier group" as part of operations against the Islamic State group. She arrived back in Portsmouth on 5 August 2016.

In January 2017 she escorted the  along the English Channel on the latter's return voyage from Syria to Kola Bay.

During February 2017 she conducted the Submarine Command Course off the Norwegian Coast and was then awarded the Fleet Effectiveness Flag. She then went into dry dock 'C' in Portsmouth for most of July 2017. Whilst in dry dock, the band of the Royal Yeomanry played under the keel. She returned to service on 29 August 2017 and was operational north of Scotland where she was "man marking" the Russian carrier Admiral Kuznetsov.

St Albans entered refit in Devonport in July 2019; once complete she'll permanently shift base port and join the Devonport Flotilla.

Affiliations
HMS St Albans is principally affiliated to the current Duke of St Albans. The ship is also affiliated to:
 City of St Albans
 2nd Battalion, Royal Anglian Regiment
 Royal Naval Reserve
 RAF Marham
 Haileybury CCF
 Ryde School CCF
 1st Luton Sea Scouts
 Worshipful Company of Haberdashers
 Worshipful Company of Marketors
 Hertfordshire Sea Cadets

References

Bibliography

External links

 

Frigates of the United Kingdom
Ships built on the River Clyde
2000 ships
Type 23 frigates of the Royal Navy